Sheikh Jamal Inani National Park (also known as Inani National Park') is a protected national park in Bangladesh. Located at Ukhia Upazila under Cox's Bazar District, the park is named after Sheikh Jamal, the second son of Bangladesh's first president Sheikh Mujibur Rahman.

The government of Bangladesh declared it as a national park on 9 July 2019. Home to the Western hoolock gibbon, it covers an area of 7,085 hectares. It is located in the Inani reserved forest range of Ukhia.

References

National parks of Bangladesh
Cox's Bazar District
Protected areas established in 2019
2019 establishments in Bangladesh
Forests of Bangladesh